Sanna-Kaisa Saari (born October 3, 1987, in Ekenäs) is a Swedish-Finnish beauty pageant titleholder. Saari represented Sweden at Miss Tourism Queen International 2009 in China where she was 2nd runner up in the Miss Charm special award. She also represented Sweden at Miss Tourism International 2010 in Malaysia 

She represented Finland in the Top Model of The World 2010 in Germany.
She was also a finalist the Finnish Miss Suomi-pageant in 2012 

During 2019 she started as a Finnish presenter of the mobile gameshow Primetime.

Personal life
In 2011, Saari moved back to Finland from Sweden, where she had moved with her mother at young age.

References

1987 births
Living people
Finnish beauty pageant winners
Finnish emigrants to Sweden